Beta-actin (human gene and protein abbreviation ACTB/ACTB) is one of six different actin isoforms which have been identified in humans.  This is one of the two nonmuscle cytoskeletal actins.  Actins are highly conserved proteins that are involved in cell motility, structure and integrity.  Alpha actins are a major constituent of the contractile apparatus.

Interactions 

Beta-actin has been shown to interact with SPTBN2. In addition, RNA-binding protein Sam68 was found to interact with the mRNA encoding β-actin, which regulates the synaptic formation of the dendritic spines with its cytoskeletal components.

Beta-actin has been shown to activate eNOS, thereby increasing NO production. An eight-amino acid motif (326-333) in eNOS has been shown to mediate the interaction between actin and eNOS.

Clinical relevance 

Recurrent mutations in this gene have been associated to cases of diffuse large B-cell lymphoma.

Applications 

Beta actin is often used in Western blotting as a loading control, to normalize total protein amounts and check for eventual protein degradation in the samples. Its transcript is also commonly used as a housekeeping gene standard in qPCR. Its molecular weight is approximately 42 kDa.

References

External links

Further reading

See also 
 Actin
 ACTA1